Herpel Brothers Foundry and Machine Shop is a historic foundry and machine shop located at Reynoldsville, Jefferson County, Pennsylvania. It was built about 1905, and is a one-story, red brick building on an ashlar sandstone foundation.  It consists of two sections: the 41 feet by 81 feet machine shop / foundry building and a 15 feet by 21 feet office.  The machine shop / foundry building features a stepped parapet gable and corrugated metal roof.  The building was acquired by Jefferson County and houses the Reynoldsville senior citizen social services center.

It was added to the National Register of Historic Places in 2004.

References

Industrial buildings and structures on the National Register of Historic Places in Pennsylvania
Industrial buildings completed in 1905
Buildings and structures in Jefferson County, Pennsylvania
National Register of Historic Places in Jefferson County, Pennsylvania
1905 establishments in Pennsylvania